A bathymetric chart is a type of isarithmic map that depicts the submerged topography and physiographic features of ocean and sea bottoms. Their primary purpose is to provide detailed depth contours of ocean topography as well as provide the size, shape and distribution of underwater features. Topographic maps display elevation above ground and are complementary to bathymetric charts. Charts use a series of lines and points at equal intervals to showcase depth or elevation. A closed shape with increasingly smaller shapes inside of it can indicate an ocean trench or a seamount, or underwater mountain, depending on whether the depths increase or decrease going inward.

Bathymetric surveys and charts are associated with the science of oceanography, particularly marine geology, and underwater engineering or other specialized purposes. Bathymetric data used to produce charts can also be converted to bathymetric profiles which are vertical sections through a feature.

History

Ancient Egypt 

The use of bathymetry and the development of bathymetric charts dates back around the 19th century BC to ancient Egypt. Depictions on tomb walls such as the bas-relief carvings of Deir al-Bahri commissioned by Queen Hatshepsut in the 16th century BC show ancient mariners using long slender poles as sounding poles to determine the depth of the Nile River and into the Nile River Delta.

Ancient Greece 

The first written account and mapped records of sounding did not occur until 1000 years after the Egyptians had begun sounding and mapping the Nile. The Greek historian Herodotus writes of a sounding in 66 feet of water of the mouth of the Nile in the river delta. He writes of yellow mud being brought up similar to the same that was deposited with the yearly floods. These accounts show a heightened awareness of regional depths and seafloor characteristics among ancient mariners and demonstrate that discoveries in bathymetry and the use of bathymetric charts had progressed significantly.

Ancient Rome 
The New Testament recounts soundings being taken with the shipwreck of Paul on the island of Malta in the Book of Acts. Chapter 27, verses 27-44 recount the experience:27 "...as we were driven up and down in Adria, about midnight the shipmen deemed that they drew near to some country;"

28 "And sounded, and found it twenty fathoms: and when they had gone a little further, they sounded again, and found it fifteen fathoms."

29 "Then fearing lest we should have fallen upon rocks, they cast four anchors out of the stern..."

39 "And when it was day, they knew not the land..."

40 "And when they had taken up the anchors, they committed themselves unto the sea . . . and made toward shore."

41 And falling into a place where two seas met, they ran the ship aground; and the forepart stuck fast, and remained unmoveable, but the hinder part was broken with the violence of the waves.Verse 39 states that "they knew not the land" indicating that their knowledge of sea was obtained from the experiences of others as well as the memory of having been there before. Sailing directions called a periplus did exist by the First Century A.D. giving general coastal configurations. Commercially available charts of the depths of the sea and surrounding coast would not be available for almost another thousand years.

Early modern period 

Up to this point, bathymetric charts were rare as mariners continued to rely on heavy ropes and lead weights to take depth readings and chart the open ocean. Minor advances in the surveying and depth charting of the oceans occurred in the 200 years since Columbus sailed to the Americas. In 1647, Robert Dudley published the atlas, 'Dell'Arcano del Mare' (Secrets of the Sea). His work far outpaced anything that had been published previously with maps and charts constructed in the Mercator projection as well as containing some of the first charts to show printed depths on the North American Atlantic Seaboard. His publication provided the groundwork for future mariners and inventors to continue to develop new and inventive ways to produce high quality charts and surveys of the world's lakes and oceans.

Comparison with hydrographic chart 
A bathymetric chart differs from a hydrographic chart in that accurate presentation of the underwater features is the goal, while safe navigation is the requirement for the hydrographic chart.

A hydrographic chart will obscure the actual features to present a simplified version to help mariners avoid underwater hazards.

Joining a bathymetric chart and topographic map 
In an ideal case, the joining of a bathymetric chart and topographic map of the same scale and projection of the same geographic area would be seamless. The only difference would be that the values begin increasing after crossing the zero at the designated sea level datum. Thus the topographic map's mountains have the greatest values while the bathymetric chart's greatest depths have the greatest values.

Simply put, the bathymetric chart is intended to show the land if overlying waters were removed in exactly the same manner as the topographic map.

Within hydrography 
Bathymetric surveys are a subset of the science of hydrography. They differ slightly from the surveys required to create the product of hydrography in its more limited application and as conducted by the national and international agencies tasked with producing charts and publications for safe navigation. That chart product is more accurately termed a navigation or hydrographic chart with a strong bias toward the presentation of essential safety information.

Bathymetric surveys

See also

References

External links
 3-D Bathymetric Chart Activity: An introduction to the Nautical Chart
  "The very earliest rendition of a bathymetric map of an oceanic basin. Matthew Fontaine Maury published this map in 1853 in his book  "Explanations and Sailing Directions to Accompany the Wind and Current Charts ...." NOAA Photo Library. 
 General Bathymetric Chart of the Oceans (GEBCO)
 Bathymetric Data Viewer from NOAA's NCEI
USGS Bathymetric Surveys
History of Bathymetry and Bathymetric Charts
Web Based Bathymetry viewer for North America, Europe and Australia

Map types
Hydrography
Physical geography
Scientific visualization